Microcella is a Gram-positive, non-spore-forming, aerobic and non-motile genus of bacteria in the family Microbacteriaceae.

References

Microbacteriaceae
Bacteria genera